XXIV Corps (24th Corps) was a U.S. Army Corps-level command during World War II and the Vietnam War.

History

World War II
XXIV Corps was activated at Fort Shafter, Hawaii, on 8 April 1944. It participated in the invasion of Leyte in the Philippine Islands on 20 October 1944, with the 7th Infantry Division and 96th Infantry Division its major combat units. During the campaign on Leyte and aided by Filipino regular and constable force of the Philippine Commonwealth Army and Philippine Constabulary military units, the 77th Infantry Division came under control of XXIV Corps.

From 1 April to 30 June 1945, XXIV Corps and its divisions participated in the invasion of Okinawa. In September 1945, after the surrender of Japan, XXIV Corps moved to Korea, where it remained on occupation duty until its inactivation on 25 January 1949.

Vietnam
XXIV Corps was created on 15 August 1968 to replace the "Provisional Corps Vietnam," a temporary headquarters (known as MACV Forward Command Post or MACV Forward between 25 January and 10 March) created 10 March 1968 during the Tet Offensive. Upon its formation, XXIV Corps was placed under the operational control of the III Marine Force to control the activities of U.S. Army ground combat units deployed in northern South Vietnam and had its headquarters at Phu Bai until 9 March 1970, when it relocated to Camp Horn, Da Nang. At that time it assumed control of all U.S. ground forces in I Corps Tactical Zone (I CTZ), with all remaining Marine units coming under its operational control until their withdrawal. During its service in Vietnam XXIV Corps was a component command of Headquarters, US Army Vietnam (USARV).

Area of responsibility and units assigned
XXIV Corps' area of responsibility was I Corps Tactical Zone ("Eye Corps"), later renamed Military Region 1, which comprised the five northernmost provinces of the South Vietnam. At various times it controlled the following units:
1st Cavalry Division (Airmobile)
23rd Infantry Division (Americal)
101st Airborne Division (Airmobile)
1st Brigade, 5th Infantry Division (Mechanized)
3rd Brigade, 82nd Airborne Division
173rd Airborne Brigade
196th Infantry Brigade (Light)
108th Artillery Group
III Marine Expeditionary Force
3rd Marine Amphibious Brigade
Task Force Clearwater (U.S. Navy)

Inactivation
XXIV Corps was inactivated on 30 June 1972 in the final stages the withdrawal of U.S. ground combat forces from Vietnam, and its assets formed the basis for its successor, the First Regional Assistance Command (FRAC).

Commanders
Major General John R. Hodge (9 April 1944 – 15 August 1948)
Major General John B. Coulter (1948-9)
Lt. General Richard Stilwell (1968–9)
 Maj. General Melvin Zais (1969–70)
 Lt. General James W. Sutherland (1970–1)
 Lt. Gen. Welborn G. Dolvin (1971-2)

Deputy commanders
Major General Raymond G. Davis (March 1968 - May 1968)
Major General Clifford B. Drake (May 1968 - June 1969)
Major General Edwin B. Wheeler (June 1969 - April 1970)
Major General George S. Bowman Jr. (April 1970 - August 1970)

Chiefs of Staff
Brigadier General Crump Garvin (1944–46)
Brigadier General Oliver B. Patton (1968–71)

Artillery commanders
Brigadier General Arthur M. Harper (1944 - 44)
Brigadier General Josef R. Sheetz (1944–45)

Chief Engineer
Brigadier General Frederic B. Butler (1947)

Notes

References
 
 Stanton, Shelby, Vietnam Order of Battle, 

24
South West Pacific theatre of World War II
Leyte
Leyte
Military units and formations of the United States Army in the Vietnam War
24
Military units and formations established in 1944
Military units and formations disestablished in 1972